Berenjgan or Berenjegan may refer to:
 Berenjgan, Chaharmahal and Bakhtiari
 Berenjegan, Isfahan